Holsey Scranton Scriptus Lee, Sr. (January 29, 1899 – February 13, 1974) was an American Negro league baseball pitcher. He played from 1921 to 1934 with several teams. He was nicknamed both Scrip and Script.

Before his Negro leagues career, Lee served in the National Guard, fighting against Pancho Villa's forces at the Mexican border in 1916. He also served in the 372nd Infantry during World War I, earning two battle stars and a Purple Heart.

References

External links
 and Baseball-Reference Black Baseball stats and Seamheads
NLB museum

1899 births
1974 deaths
Cleveland Red Sox players
Baltimore Black Sox players
Bacharach Giants players
Philadelphia Stars players
Hilldale Club players
Baseball players from Alabama
Baseball players from Washington, D.C.
United States Army personnel of World War I
20th-century African-American sportspeople
Baseball pitchers